The  was a group of medium-sized coastal submarines built for the Imperial Japanese Navy (IJN) during World War II. They are also known as Type KS submarine.

Design and description
In 1940, the IJN designed a point-defence coastal submarine because they wanted to save their larger submarines for fleet battles. The Ro-100 class was derived from the preceding Kaichū type. They displaced  surfaced and  submerged.

For surface running, the boats were powered by two  diesel engines, each driving one propeller shaft. When submerged each propeller was driven by a  electric motor. They could reach  on the surface and  underwater.

The boats were armed with four internal bow  torpedo tubes and carried a total of eight torpedoes. They were also armed with two single mounts for  Type 96 anti-aircraft guns or a single  L/40 AA gun.

Boats
18 boats were built in 1941-1944 under the Maru Rin Programme (Boat #210-218) and the Maru Kyū Programme (Boat #400-408).

Footnotes

Bibliography
 

, History of Pacific War Vol.17 I-Gō Submarines, Gakken (Japan), January 1998, 
Rekishi Gunzō, History of Pacific War Extra, "Perfect guide, The submarines of the Imperial Japanese Forces", Gakken (Japan), March 2005, 
The Maru Special, Japanese Naval Vessels No.43 Japanese Submarines III, Ushio Shobō (Japan), September 1980, Book code 68343-43
The Maru Special, Japanese Naval Vessels No.132 Japanese Submarines I "Revised edition", Ushio Shobō (Japan), February 1988, Book code 68344-36

Submarine classes
 
Submarines of the Imperial Japanese Navy
Japan campaign